WXNT (1430 AM) is a commercial radio station in Indianapolis, Indiana.  The station is owned by Cumulus Media, and carries an all-sports radio format, as an affiliate of the CBS Sports Radio Network. WXNT's schedule consists of CBS Sports Radio shows and live sporting events.

WXNT studios and offices are located on N. Meridian Street, along with sister stations 99.5 WZPL and 107.9 WNTR.  The transmitter and antenna are located off Knollton Road at West 46th Street, on the northwest side of Indianapolis.  WXNT operates at 5000 watts around the clock, using a non-directional antenna by day.  But at night a directional antenna is required to protect other stations on AM 1430 from interference.

History 
WXNT first signed on as WKBF in 1926 at 1400 kHz.  Eleven years later, the station changed its call letters to WIRE, as announced by the Federal Communications Commission on March 16, 1935.  In 1941, the station moved to its current dial position at 1430 kHz, when the North American Regional Broadcasting Agreement or NARBA required many AM stations to change their frequencies.

The station was mentioned as officially opening its new studios on the show "Nightbeat" on October 27, 1950.  For most of the 1960s, 70s and 80s, its programming consisted of country music, which proved an enormous ratings success.  In 1970, WIRE's country format was number one in the Indianapolis radio market with a 25.6 Pulse rating share, also making it the highest-rated country station in the nation, according to a 1970 Billboard magazine article.   But over time, country music fans shifted their listening to FM radio.

When Mid America Radio flipped WXTZ (103.3 FM) from easy listening to adult contemporary in 1989, the format and call letters moved to AM.

On November 28, 1990, the station became WFXF, which simulcast then-sister station WFXF-FM 103.3 and its classic rock format known as "103.3 The Fox."  (Today that station is alternative rock/active rock WOLT).  On May 18, 1992, the call letters for AM 1430 were changed to WCKN.

On September 8, 1994, the station switched to a syndicated adult standards format known as "The Music of Your Life," using the call sign WMYS.  The station also aired Indianapolis Ice hockey games.  On October 22, 2001, the station changed its call sign to WXNT, with the NT standing for News/Talk, its new format.  WXNT would broadcast Notre Dame Fighting Irish football and previously broadcast Butler University basketball.

On January 2, 2013, WXNT switched to all-sports, becoming a CBS Sports Radio Network affiliate.  The station continues to be the Indianapolis home for Notre Dame football.

On February 13, 2019, Cumulus Media and Entercom announced an agreement in which WXNT, WZPL, and WNTR would be swapped to Cumulus in exchange for WNSH (now WXBK) in New York City and WHLL and WMAS-FM in Springfield, Massachusetts. Under the terms of the deal, Cumulus began operating WXNT under a local marketing agreement on March 1, 2019. The swap was completed on May 9, 2019.

References

External links

Indiana Radio Archive, WXNT
FCC History Cards for WXNT

XNT
CBS Sports Radio stations
Cumulus Media radio stations
Radio stations established in 1926
1926 establishments in Indiana